Nandalike Balachandra Rao (born 12.03.1953) is the son of Nandalike Subba Rao and Girijamma. He did his B.A. from Govt. college, Mangalore and Diploma in public relations and journalism from Mysore University.

Former banker Nandalike Balachandra Rao, who made meaningful efforts to immortalise Kannada poet laureate Kavi Muddana’s works, was conferred the Kavi Muddanna Award. Muddana (Kannada:ಮುದ್ದಣ) (January 24, 1870 – February 15, 1901) - was a Kannada poet, writer a Yakshagana poet from Nandalike.

Recently his book ‘Kumara Vijaya’ got released at Tulu Parba.

References

See also
 Muddana
 Nandalike

Living people
Year of birth missing (living people)